For the historic building in France, see Villa Mirasol (Les Sables d'Olonne).

Villa Miraso is a village and rural locality (municipality) in La Pampa Province in Argentina.

References

Populated places in La Pampa Province